The MTV Video Music Awards Japan 2004 were hosted by entertainer and singer Tomomitsu Yamaguchi at Tokyo Bay NK Hall in Urayasu, Chiba.

Awards
Winners are in bold text.

Video of the Year
Missy Elliott — "Pass That Dutch"
 Mr. Children — "Kurumi"
 Mika Nakashima — "Seppun"
 Outkast — "Hey Ya!"
 Radiohead — "There There"

Album of the Year
Outkast — Speakerboxxx/The Love Below
 Missy Elliott — This Is Not a Test!
 Exile — Exile Entertainment
 Linkin Park — Meteora
 Mika Nakashima — Love

Best Male Video
Pharrell featuring Jay-Z — "Frontin'"
 Ken Hirai — "Style"
 Sean Paul — "Get Busy"
 Justin Timberlake — "Rock Your Body"
 Zeebra — "Touch The Sky"

Best Female Video
Ayumi Hamasaki — "Because of You"
 Beyoncé featuring Jay-Z — "Crazy in Love"
 BoA — "Double"
 Mika Nakashima — "Yuki no Hana"
 Britney Spears featuring Madonna — "Me Against the Music"

Best Group Video
Kick The Can Crew — "Saga Continue"
 The Black Eyed Peas — "Where Is the Love?"
 Blue — "Guilty"
 Dragon Ash — "Morrow"
 Rip Slyme — "Joint"

Best New Artist
Orange Range — "Shanghai Honey"
 Evanescence — "Bring Me to Life"
 Good Charlotte — "The Anthem"
 Halcali — "Strawberry Chips"
 Stacie Orrico — "Stuck"

Best Rock Video
Good Charlotte — "The Anthem"
 175R — "Sora ni Utaeba"
 Dragon Ash — "Morrow"
 Linkin Park — "Somewhere I Belong"
 Metallica — "St. Anger"

Best Pop Video
Ayumi Hamasaki — "No Way to Say"
 Blue — "Guilty"
 Ketsumeishi — "Natsu no Omoide"
 Orange Range — "Shanghai Honey"
 Outkast — "Hey Ya!"

Best R&B Video
Namie Amuro — "Put 'Em Up"
 Mary J. Blige featuring Method Man — "Love @ 1st Sight"
 Double — "Destiny"
 Crystal Kay — "Candy"
 Alicia Keys — "You Don't Know My Name"

Best Hip-Hop Video
Zeebra — "Touch The Sky"
 50 Cent — "21 Questions"
 Missy Elliott — "Pass That Dutch"
 Jay-Z featuring Pharrell — "Change Clothes"
 Rhymester — "The Great Amateurism"

Best Dance Video
BoA — "Double"
 Fire Ball — "Da Bala"
 Kylie Minogue — "Slow"
 Shinichi Osawa featuring Kj — "Shinin"
 Sean Paul — "Get Busy"

Breakthrough Video
Mika Nakashima — "Love Addict"
 The Black Eyed Peas — "Where Is the Love?"
 Halcali — "Giri Giri Surf Rider"
 Orange Range — "Shanghai Honey"
 Sean Paul — "Get Busy"

Best Video from a film
Pink featuring William Orbit — "Feel Good Time" (from Charlie's Angels: Full Throttle)
 Evanescence — "Bring Me to Life" (from Daredevil)
 Korn — "Did My Time" (from Lara Croft Tomb Raider: The Cradle of Life)
 Nelly, P. Diddy and Murphy Lee — "Shake Ya Tailfeather" (from Bad Boys 2)
 Quruli — "Highway" (from Josee, the Tiger and the Fish)

Best Collaboration
Beyoncé featuring Jay-Z — "Crazy in Love"
 Ken Hirai and Kyu Sakamoto — "Miagete Goran Yoru no Hoshi o"
 M-Flo Loves Crystal Kay — "Reeewind!"
 Crystal Kay Loves M-Flo — "I Like It"
 Britney Spears featuring Madonna — "Me Against the Music"
 Voice of Love Posse — "Voice of Love"

Best Live Performance
Ayumi Hamasaki
 Mary J. Blige
 Missy Elliott
 Good Charlotte
 M-Flo

Best buzz ASIA

Japan
Namie Amuro — "Put 'Em Up"
 AI — "After the Rain"
 Chemistry — "Ashita e Kaeru"
 Ken Hirai — "Style"
 Hyde — "Horizon"
 Crystal Kay — "Can't be Stopped"
 Kick the Can Crew — "Vacation"
 Rip Slyme — "Joint"
 Hitomi Yaida — "Hitori Jenga"

South Korea
M — "Just One Night"
 Bada — "Music"
 Drunken Tiger — "Thumb"
 Eugene — "The Best"
 Jaurim — "Hey Guyz"
 Koo Jun Yup — "Escape"
 Wheesung — "With Me"
 Yoon Band — "I Will Forget"
 Yoon Gun — "By Chance"

Taiwan
Leehom Wang — "Last Night"
 5566 — "Waiting"
 A-Mei — "Brave"
 Jay Chou — "In Name of Father"
 Elva Hsiao — "Password to Love"
 Vivian Hsu — "Mask"
 Mayday — "God of Gambling"
 David Tao — "Black Orange"
 Faye Wong — "Will Be Loving"

Special awards

Best Director
The White Stripes — "The Hardest Button To Button" (directed by Michael Gondry)

Best Special Effects
The Chemical Brothers — "Get Yourself High" (Special Effects: Joseph Kahn)

Best style
Mika Nakashima — "Kissing"

Best Website
Kick the Can Crew (www.kickthecancrew.com)

Most Impressive Performance
Mary J. Blige

Inspiration Award
Janet Jackson

Legend Award
Ozzy Osbourne

Live performances
 Ayumi Hamasaki — "Because of You"
 The Darkness — "I Believe in a Thing Called Love"
 Good Charlotte — "Walk Away"
 Janet Jackson — "All Nite (Don't Stop)"
 Mika Nakashima
 Missy Elliott — "Pass That Dutch"
 Namie Amuro — "Alarm"
 N.E.R.D — "She Wants to Move"
 Outkast
 Orange Range
 Zeebra — "Touch the sky"

References

2004 in Japanese music

id:MTV Video Music Awards Japan